Idiothrips is a genus of thrips in the family Phlaeothripidae.

Species
 Idiothrips bellus
 Idiothrips maghrebinus

References

Phlaeothripidae
Thrips
Thrips genera